A number of steamships have carried the name Laura, including:

, built as Roll Call in 1875, renamed Ellen in 1881 and then renamed Laura and purchased by Peter Mærsk-Møller in 1886
, built for the London and South Western Railway, sold in 1927
, built for A/S Dampskibs Selskap Vesterhavet, sold in 1917

Ship names